Gokulathil Seethai is a 2008 Indian Tamil-language soap opera starring Sanghavi, Babloo Prithiveeraj, Delhi Kumar and Sulakshana. It replaced Attam Pattam and it aired on Kalaignar TV from on 22 September 2008 to 23 October 2009. This is the series through which Sanghavi made her debut into the television.

The show was directed by C.J Basker. It also aired in Australia Tamil channel on Global Tamil Vision. From 2017 the show was relaunched in Mega TV.

Synopsis
The story starts in Palani with middle class girl named Sita. Gokul proposed to Sita and they get married with Sita's family's approval. However soon after getting married Sita learns of Gokul's psychosis and Sita decides to leave Gokul. Sita elopes from Gokul's house and starts a new life in Chennai but Gokul follows her there and again creates havoc in her life. Gokul plans to kill Sita.

Cast

Main
 Sanghavi as Sita
 Babloo Prithiveeraj as Gokul

Sita Family
 Delhi Kumar (Sita's father)
 Meera Krishnan(Sita's mother)
 My Dear Bootham Abhilash (Sita's younger brother)
 Srithika (Sita's sister)

Supporting
 Ajay Rathnam
 Sulakshana
 Prajin/Sai Prashanth
 Balaji
 Manjari
 Usha
 Sanmukasundharam
 Ashok
 Sathish
 Durka
 Siva Kavitha

Production
The series was directed C.J Basker, along with the directed crew of 1991-2010 Sun TV Serials Chithi (1999-2001), Manaivi (2004-2006), Anjali (2006-2008).

Title track
The title track of this particular series was recorded in Mumbai.

It was composed Dhina and sung by Sadhana Sargam.

Soundtrack

Awards 
The Mylapore academy 40th annual Television awards function, were held on September 20, 2009 at the Narada Gana Sabha Auditorium.

International broadcast
The Series was released on 22 September 2008 on Kalaignar TV. The Show was also broadcast internationally on Channel's international distribution. It airs in Sri Lanka, Singapore, Malaysia, South East Asia, Middle East, Oceania, South Africa and Sub Saharan Africa on Kalaignar TV and also aired in United States, Canada, Europe on Kalaignar Ayngaran TV.
 The show was relaunched in Mega TV at 20:30 (IST).
 In Australia Tamil Channel on Global Tamil Vision.

References

External links
 

Kalaignar TV television series
Tamil-language thriller television series
2008 Tamil-language television series debuts
2009 Tamil-language television series endings
2000s Tamil-language television series
Tamil-language television shows